The 2009 "Final Four" was an international baseball competition held in Barcelona, Spain, on June 20–21, 2009, between four teams from the professional leagues in Italy and the Netherlands.

Caffè Danesi Nettuno from Nettuno, Italy won its second straight title.

Game results

Semi finals

3rd place

Final

Final standings

External links
Game Results

References

Final Four (Baseball), 2009
2009
European Champion Cup Final Four